The Men's trampoline competition at the 2016 Summer Olympics was held at the HSBC Arena.

The medals were presented by Barbara Kendall IOC member, New Zealand and Horst Kunze, FIG Trampoline Technical Committee President.

Competition format
The competition had rounds: qualification and final. In qualification, the gymnasts performed two routines: compulsory and voluntary. Scores for the two were summed, and the best eight gymnasts moved on to the final. The final consisted of a single routine, with qualification scores not carrying over.

Qualification

The gymnasts who ranked top eight qualified for final round. In case of there were more than two gymnasts in same NOC, the last ranked among them would not qualify to final round. The next best ranked gymnast would qualify instead.

Final

References

Men's trampoline
2016
Men's events at the 2016 Summer Olympics